Keetmanshoop railway station is a railway station serving the town of Keetmanshoop in Namibia. It was erected in 1908. when the territory was colonised by Imperial Germany. It is part of the TransNamib Railway, and is located along the Windhoek to Upington line that was inaugurated in 1915 and connects Namibia with South Africa. Keetmanshoop also has a junction to Seeheim and Aus, completed in 1908.

Gallery

See also 

 Railway stations in Namibia

References 

Railway stations in Namibia
TransNamib Railway
Buildings and structures in ǁKaras Region
Keetmanshoop